Giantin or Golgin subfamily B member 1 is a protein that in humans is encoded by the GOLGB1 gene. Giantin is located at the cis-medial rims of the Golgi apparatus and is part of the Golgi matrix that is responsible for membrane trafficking in secretory pathway of proteins. This function is key for proper localisation of proteins at the plasma membrane and outside the cell (extracellular region) which is important for cell function that is dependent on for example receptors and the extracellular matrix function. Recent animal model knockout studies of GOLGB1 in mice, rat, and zebrafish have shown that phenotypes are different between species ranging from mild to severe craniofacial defects in the rodent models to just minor size defects in zebrafish. However, in adult zebrafish a tumoral calcinosis-like phenotype was observed, and in humans such phenotype has been linked to defective glycosyltransferase function (e.g. GALNT3 protein).

Function and Interactions
Giantin is a disulfide-linked homodimer which contains several (around 37) coiled-coiled domains. GOLGB1 protein has been shown to interact with ACBD3 and with PLK3 and vesicle tethering small GTPases Rab1 and Rab6. Giantin also interacts with P115 at the N-terminal coils facilitating binding to the other Golgi matrix protein GM130 that is thought to be important for Golgi secretory function. Loss-of function studies of giantin have also suggested a role in primary cilia function and defective regulation of glycosyltransferase expression and calcineurin signalling in tissue culture cells.

References

Further reading